Fear Factor: Khatron Ke Khiladi (Fear Factor: Players of Danger) simply known as Khatron Ke Khiladi is an Indian Hindi-language stunt based reality television series based on the American series Fear Factor. First launched as Fear Factor India on Sony TV it was sold to Colors TV and was relaunched as  Fear Factor: Khatron Ke Khiladi on 21 July 2008. A spin-off of the main-series Fear Factor: Khatron Ke Khiladi – Made in India was launched on 1 August 2020 where previous year contestants participated.

Series overview

Season 1

Khatron Ke Khiladi 1  was hosted by Akshay Kumar. Nethra Raghuraman was declared the winner of the season.

Contestants
 Nethra Raghuraman (winner)
 Urvashi Sharma (runner-up)
 Aditi Govitrikar (3rd place)
 Anjana Sukhani (4th place)
 Pooja Bedi (5th place)
 Sonali Kulkarni (6th place)
 Yana Gupta (7th place)
 Meghana Naidu (8th place)
 Anita Hassanandani (9th place)
 Dipannita Sharma (10th place)
 Vidya Malvade (11th place)
 Tapur Chatterjee (12th place)

Season 2

Khatron Ke Khiladi 2 was hosted by Akshay Kumar. Anushka Manchanda was declared the winner of the season.

Contestants
 Anushka Manchanda (winner)
 Jesse Randhawa (runner-up)
 Carol Gracias (3rd place)
 Rosa Catalano (4th place)
 Nauheed Cyrusi (5th place)
 Shonali Nagrani (6th place)
 Bruna Abdullah (7th place)
 Sonika Kaliraman (8th place)
 Shweta Salve (9th place)
 Mandira Bedi (10th place)
 Pia Trivedi (11th place)
 Rupali Ganguly (12th place)
 Sushma Reddy (13th place)

Season 3

Khatron Ke Khiladi 3 was hosted by Priyanka Chopra. Shabir Ahluwalia was declared the winner of the season.

Contestants
 Shabir Ahluwalia (winner)
 Ritwik Bhattacharya (runner-up)
 Dino Morea (3rd place)
 Milind Soman (4th place)
 Manjot Singh (5th place)
 Abhishek Kapoor (6th place)
 Rahul Bose (7th place)
 Terence Lewis (8th place)
 Karan Singh Grover (9th place)
 Cyrus Broacha (10th place)
 Rahul Dev (11th place)
 Angad Bedi (12th place)
 Armaan Ebrahim (13th place)

Season 4

Khatron Ke Khiladi 4 was hosted by Akshay Kumar. The tagline for this season was "Torchaar 4". Aarti Chhabria was declared the winner of the season.

Contestants
 Aarti Chabria (winner)
 Mauli Dave (runner-up)
 Diandra Soares (3rd place)
 Dina Singh (4th place)
 Mia Uyeda (5th place)
 Anjum Chopra (6th place)
 Aashka Goradia (7th place)
 Alesia Raut (8th place)
 Gurbani Judge (9th place)
 Kashmera Shah (10th place)
 Poonam Pandey (11th place)
 Smita Bansal (12th place)
 Sambhavna Seth (13th place)

Season 5

Khatron Ke Khiladi 5 was hosted by Rohit Shetty The tagline for this season was "Darr Ka Blockbuster". Rajneesh Duggal was declared the winner of the season.

Contestants
 Rajneesh Duggal (winner)
 Gurmeet Choudhary (runner-up)
 Nikitin Dheer (3rd place)
 Debina Bonnerjee (4th place)
 Salman Yusuff Khan (5th place)
 Teejay Sidhu (6th place)
 Karanvir Bohra (7th place)
 Gauahar Khan (8th place)
 Ranvir Shorey (9th place)
 Deana Uppal (10th place)
 Ajaz Khan (11th place)
 Geeta Tandon (12th place)
 Dayanand Shetty (13th place)
 Kushal Tandon (14th place)
 Mugdha Godse (15th place)
 Rochelle Rao (16th place)
 Pooja Gor (17th place)

Season 6

Khatron Ke Khiladi 6 was hosted by Rohit Shetty. The tagline for this season was "Darr Ka Blockbuster Returns". Aashish Chaudhary was declared the winner of the season.

Contestants
 Ashish Chaudhary (winner)
 Meiyang Chang (runner-up)
 Sagarika Ghatge (3rd place)
 Iqbal Khan (4th place)
 Hussain Kuwajerwala (5th place)
 Asha Negi (6th place)
 Rakesh Kumar (7th place)
 Nandish Sandhu (8th place)
 Sana Khan(9th place)
 Rashami Desai (10th place)
 Nathalia Kaur (11th place)
 Riddhi Dogra (12th place)
 Archana Vijaya (13th place)
 Sidharth Bhardwaj(14th place)
 Harshad Arora (15th place)

Season 7

Khatron Ke Khiladi 7 was hosted by Arjun Kapoor. The tagline for this season was "Kabhi पीड़ा Kabhi कीड़ा in Argentina". Sidharth Shukla was declared the winner of the season.

Contestants
 Sidharth Shukla (winner)
 Sana Saeed (runner-up)
 Mukti Mohan (3rd place)
 Tanishaa Mukerji (4th place)
 Vivian Dsena (5th place)
 Raghav Juyal (6th place)
 Vivan Bhatena (7th place)
 Parvathy Omanakuttan (8th place)
 Jay Bhanushali(Quit)
 Mahhi Vij (10th place)
 Aishwarya Sakhuja (11th place)
 Tina Datta (12th place)
 Faisal Khan (13th place)
 Yuvraj Walmiki (14th place)
 Himmanshoo A. Malhotra (15th place)

Season 8

Khatron Ke Khiladi 8 was hosted by Rohit Shetty. The tagline for this season was "Pain in Spain". Shantanu Maheshwari was declared the winner of the season.

Contestants

Season 9

Khatron Ke Khiladi 9 was hosted by Rohit Shetty. The tagline for this season was "Jigar Pe Trigger". Punit Pathak was declared as winner of the season.

Contestants

Season 10

Khatron Ke Khiladi 10 was hosted by Rohit Shetty. The tagline for this season was "Jahaan Darr Lega Class Aur Dega Trass". The telecast was postponed for 3 months due to COVID-19 pandemic. Week 7 episodes started from 27 June. Karishma Tanna was declared as the winner of the season 10.

Contestants

Season 11

Khatron Ke Khiladi 11 was hosted by Rohit Shetty. The tagline for this season was "Darr VS Dare". Arjun Bijlani was declared as winner of the season.

Contestants

Season 12

Khatron Ke Khiladi 12 is hosted by Rohit Shetty. The tagline for this season was "Bach Ke Kahan Jayega? Khatra Kahin Se Bhi Aayega!". The show premiered on 2 July 2022, on Colors TV. Spanning over 26 episodes, it is the longest season of the series since its inception. Tushar Kalia was declared as winner of the season.

Contestants

References

External links 
 
 Khatron Ke Khiladi on Voot

 
Fear Factor
2000s Indian television series
2010s Indian television series
Colors TV original programming
Indian game shows
Indian reality television series
Indian television series based on American television series
Hindi-language television shows